James Ray "Bud" Cockrell (March 28, 1950 – March 6, 2010) was an American musician and singer-songwriter, best known as the original bassist and one of the lead vocalists for the San Francisco-based California rock band Pablo Cruise. Cockrell was in the band at its inception in 1973, but left in 1977 before its most successful album, Worlds Away, to form a duo (Cockrell & Santos) with his wife and former It's a Beautiful Day bandmate, Pattie Santos. He was replaced by bassist Bruce Day.

Cockrell previously had a brief stint with the band It's a Beautiful Day with David LaFlamme and Pattie Santos and featured guests included Airto Moreira and his wife Flora Purim of Return To Forever and jazz fusion bassist Jaco Pastorius of Weather Report.

Biography
He was born James Ray Cockrell in the Mississippi Delta where his father, Corbet Cockrell, and his uncle, Clint, taught him to play the guitar and bass guitar. Cockrell and his father played in bars throughout the Delta. His mother, Shugg Roncali, and his sisters Dottie, Rita, and Stephanie, still live in the region. Cockrell married Pattie Santos, and left Pablo Cruise to work with her in creating their own album, Cockrell & Santos. Santos was killed in a car crash near Geyserville in Sonoma County, California on December 14, 1989.

Cockrell also did a brief stint as the singer with Sons of Champlin from 1977 to 1978 in between his work with Cockrell & Santos.

Cockrell wrote many of the songs performed by his bands. He was known as the "Rock and Roller" but also played blues and country music.

He spent his last years living in the Delta on dialysis, where he died on March 6, 2010, due to complications of diabetes.

Discography
 It's A Beautiful Day…Today (It's a Beautiful Day, Columbia Records, 1973)
 Pablo Cruise (Pablo Cruise's debut album, 1975)
 Lifeline (Pablo Cruise's second album, 1976)
 A Place In The Sun (Pablo Cruise's third album, 1977)
 A New Beginning (Cockrell & Santos' only album, A&M, 1978)

References

External links
 
 
 
 

American male singer-songwriters
1950 births
2010 deaths
American rock songwriters
American rock singers
American rock bass guitarists
American male bass guitarists
People from Greenville, Mississippi
Singer-songwriters from Mississippi
Deaths from diabetes
A&M Records artists
Guitarists from Mississippi
20th-century American bass guitarists
Pablo Cruise members
20th-century American male musicians